The Crossroads is a high fantasy series of books by American writer Kate Elliott, consisting of three books to date. The story takes place in a land known as the Hundred, as well as several neighbouring lands. The story revolves around a large cast of characters who struggle against a growing army that is slowly covering the land with its shadow. The army is led by a mysterious group of people known as Guardians, and in particular by a woman. The ultimate goal of the Guardians is yet to be revealed.

Book One: Spirit Gate 
In the first book in the Crossroads series, we are introduced to Reeve Joss, a proud and vain man who searches for answers to the murder of his lover Marit. At the same time, newlywed couple Mai and Anji are sent into exile when political turmoil threatens their lives. They decide to go to the Hundred and start a new life with an entourage of servants and soldiers under Anji's command.
The outlanders soon find that this new land that they thought would be a resting place has been thrown into turmoil as bands of brigands and thieves pillage small villages and a much larger army stands poised to attack the cities. Looming over the intersecting paths of each lead character is the question of where the Guardians have gone. Why did they abandon their people, and what has happened to them?

Book Two: Shadow Gate 
The second book focuses on the Guardians. We are introduced to Marit, the Reeve who died at the beginning of the series. Early in the book, it is revealed that somehow she was brought back from death before she could pass through the Spirit Gate and into an afterlife. As Marit searches for answers about who she has become, she encounters several other Guardians who were once ordinary people: a young woman named Kiriya who came from the plains beyond the Hundred, the long-lost brother Hari who outlanders Mai and Shai believe to be dead, and a man who dresses as an envoy of Ilu. Meanwhile, after the successful defence of the city of Olossi, the Qin have begun to settle down and build their own community around a new Reeve Hall nicknamed Naya Hall after the oil of naya that repelled the invaders. Bai accompanies a small band of men and a woman to infiltrate the army in the North, while her brother Kesh travels back to the southern lands to find out information about a group of assassins that has been sent to kill Anji and his men.

Book Three: Traitor's Gate 
The third book of the Crossroads trilogy recounts how the forces of the Hundred, under the command of Anji, defeat the army of the Star of Light led by the corrupted Guardians, and how in the aftermath Anji unexpectedly takes over the Hundred himself. The remaining faithful Guardians (Jothinin, the last of the original group other than Night; Kirit; Marit) reveal to Joss and others how to kill a Guardian, and one by one all the other Guardians are killed. Kesh and his Ri Amarah companions return from their trip south, and Kesh courts Mai's friend Maravia (to eventual success and Mai's chagrin). Shai and Bai travel through the army of the Star of Light and eventually kill Night, the leader of the corrupt Guardians. Mai discovers Indiyabu, where the Guardians were first created (though she and her allies never quite seem to make the explicit connection), and tries to shelter Hari there, but Anji eventually returns alone and kills him. Anji also later kills Joss, by killing Scar, but unknown to him both Joss and Scar return as Guardians, Joss wearing the gold cloak he had recently taken from Radas. In Indiyabu, Mai, who gave birth to a son, Atani, in the pool where the firelings are born, is later attacked by her servant Sheyshi, who turns out to be an agent of Anji's mother, who wants Mai dead in order to marry Anji to a Sirniakan princess. Mai appears to drown in the pool, and is believed dead. However, the firelings save not only her but her second child, growing in her womb, and when Mai emerges months later she has also discovered all the Guardian cloaks (including Hari's) which Anji and his men locked in chests and threw into that same pool. Realizing Anji's betrayal and learning of his intent to marry another wife, she rejects him, and keeps their daughter while Atani remains with Anji as his future heir. Much later, Mai is revealed to have taken the cloaks from Indiyabu and when the remaining cloaks surprise her with the help of reeves not under Anji's control, she willingly frees the cloaks so that they may jess new Guardians.

Characters

Main characters
 Joss - a reeve who spends much of his time drinking and sleeping around in an attempt to recover from the death of his first love, Joss is nevertheless entirely committed to the laws of the Hundreds and has spent the majority of his career fighting the shadows encroaching on the land.
 Marit - Joss' lover twenty years before current events, she was the first reeve to be killed by the corrupted Guardians and their army. She awakened many years later as a Guardian herself, and has struggled to discover what that means and how to stop her corrupted peers.
 Anji - a captain of the Qin people who was stationed in Kartu Town to enforce the recent takeover of the area. Impressed by Mai's resolve and beauty, he arranges to marry her shortly before leaving the town, which leads to a journey across several nations into exile in the Hundreds. He is a skilled warrior and leader, but despite his cool exterior he cares for Mai deeply. As the seventh son of his father, he is able to see ghosts, but cannot hear them.
 Mai - the daughter of a prominent merchant in Kartu, Mai is a great beauty and unfailingly kind. However, she is also a skilled negotiator, both politically and as a merchant. While originally upset by her newly arranged marriage, she is now totally committed to her husband.
 Shai - the youngest of Mai's six uncles. He is unfairly disliked by much of his family and is sent to retrieve the remains of his brother Hari in the far-off country known as the Hundreds, traveling with Mai and Anji to ensure that Mai is treated well. As the seventh son of both his mother and father, he can both see and hear ghosts.
 Kirit - formerly a slave of Shai and Mai's household with blond hair, pale skin, and blue eyes (traits ascribed to demons) known as Cornflower. She is largely silent after years of abuse and rape. She takes the name Kirit after entering the Hundreds, a bastardization of her birth name Kiriya.
 Keshad - a young man sold into debt slavery twelve years before, he has worked for a merchant as his factor in an attempt to raise enough funds to free both himself and his sister. He has abandoned the gods of the Hundreds in favor of the harsh god of the neighboring Sirniakian Empire.
 Zubaidit - Keshad's younger sister, sold to the temple of the Devourer to train as a hierodule and later as an assassin. A devout believer who could either seduce a man or slit his throat, she is a very different woman from the girl that Keshad remembers.
 Nallo - a bitter and hot-tempered woman widowed by brigands. Nallo is left responsible for her three step-children until she is chosen by an eagle to become a reeve, a responsibility she does not want.
 Avisha - Nallo's eldest step-daughter and a young woman of eighteen years. She must care for her siblings after Nallo is taken for reeve training and joins Mai's household in an attempt to find a stable home.

Secondary characters
 Peddo (Peddonon)
 O'eki (Mountain)
 Priya
 Miravia
 Atani (Atanihosh)
 Reeve Pil
 Sengel
 Toughid
 Scout Tohon
 Chief Tuvi
 Jothanin
 Hari (Hari'shil)
 Sheyshi

The Eight Children 
According to the beliefs of the folk of the Hundred, the Four Mothers created the Eight children, the eight races of the Crossroads universe.

Dragonlings, those seen no more
Firelings, those who dwell within storms
Delvings, those who dwell within stone
Wildings, those who dwell in the wild forests
Lendings, those who Dwell in the grassy plains of the lend
Merlings, those who dwell in the ocean
Humans, the most common
Demons, the rarest of all, (every seventh child born of human parents is a demon, and can see or hear ghosts or sometimes both, depending on which parent you are the seventh child of, father gives sight mother gives sound)

Numbers 
In the land of the Hundred, numbers have multiple associations and significance. Also known as the Hundred count, numbers give hidden order to life.

2 = Male and female, night and day, wet and dry, life and death
3 = The three parts of a person: mind, hands and heart. The three states of mind: resting, wakened and transcendent. The three Noble Towers within every major town or city: Watch Tower, Assizes Tower and Sorrowing or Silence Tower. The three languages spoken within the Hundred
4 = The Four Mothers, who created man out of water, earth, fire and air
5 = The Five Feasts
6 = The Reeve Halls
7 = The seven Gods. Seven treasures. Seven holy gems. Seven directions.
8 = The eight children: dragonlings, firelings, delvings, wildings, lendings, merlings, demons and man
9 = The Guardians. Nine colors, which are the hues of their cloaks
10 = The Tales of Founding

Gods 
According to the beliefs of the folk of the Hundred, there are Four Mothers: Earth, Fire, Air and Water. They gave birth to the Gods of the Hundred who in turn created the first Guardians.

Taru, the Witherer
Kotaru the Thunderer
Sapanasu, the Lantern
Ilu, the Herald, the Opener of Ways
Attiratu, the Lady of Beasts
Ushara, the Merciless One
Hasibal, the Formless One

Reeves and Eagles 
The reeves handle disputes, settle disagreements and generally seek to keep the peace in the Hundred. They are divided between halls, which also house fawkners who care for the many eagles. Each hall is run by a marshal. Reeves are chosen by their eagles and usually share similar personality traits (Nallo and Tumna are both irritable and short tempered). Once an eagle is jessed by its reeve, they form a bond that can only be broken by death. While an eagle can live long enough to have several reeves (with the birds retiring to their mountain homes for a period after losing a reeve), a reeve cannot survive the death of their eagle, dying of something similar to a heart attack should their eagle be slain. Eagles are god-blessed creatures and are believed to be incorruptible. Should a reeve turn too far from the path of right, their eagle may kill them.

Joss and Scar
Volias and Trouble
Nallo and Tumna
Pil and Sweet
Peddo and Jabi
Marit and Flirt

Reeve Halls 

Clan Hall
Gold Hall
Copper Hall
Bronze Hall
Horn Hall
Iron Hall
Argent Hall
Naya Hall

Guardians and Winged Steeds 
There are nine Guardians who have been bestowed with a gift from each of the Gods: a cloak which grants protection from death (but not harm), altars which can speak across vast distances, winged horses to travel swiftly, a light which radiates from their hand, a 'staff' of judgment, an offering bowl, and a third eye and second heart to see into and understand the hearts of all. There are two ways to kill a Guardian. The first is to have five of the nine Guardians judge in a court that another Guardian deserves destruction. The second way is to take their cloak so they cannot be healed. In either case, the cloak then chooses a new host, although this may take many years. The person is someone who died serving justice, and may have touched the cloak while alive.

Marit: wearer of the cloak colored like death (white), her staff (or weapon) is a sword. She was a reeve jessed to the eagle Flirt and was Joss' lover. She touched the white cloak while exploring a Guardian altar with Joss, but shortly afterwards she was killed after being captured by Lord Radas' army, the first reeve to bee slain by the Star of Light. After her awakening, she infiltrates the army of Lord Radas and discovers a large group of Guardians led by a mysterious woman who is perhaps the longest-lived Guardian of all. She learns that these Guardians are quick to cast self-righteous judgment on anyone that opposes them. Her steed is a silvery-gray mare called Warning.
Kiriya/Cornflower/Kirit: wearer of the cloak of mist (silver), her staff is a mirror. After sacrificing her freedom to save her brother from slavery and rejuvenate her tribe, she was sold to a whorehouse and then to a cruel master after they cast her out, considering her a demon for her blong hair, blue eyes, and pale skin. She then accompanied Mai on her journey with Anji. However, Anji eventually had enough of her supposed demonic luck and drove her away in the middle of a sandstorm, where she died and was finally taken by the cloak of mist. Fierce and childlike, Kirit burns with a desire to cast judgment on all who she deems as wrong-doers, mainly in response to the way in which she was treated while in captivity. She is a skilled rider and a deadly archer. She joins Marit in opposing the majority of the Guardians. Her winged steed is a feisty bay mare called Seeing.
Jothinin: wearer of the sky blue cloak, he aided Kirit in resisting the temptation that came with being a Guardian. Although his motives are a mystery, he is strongly opposed to the cloak of night. When asked how long he has been a Guardian, his reply is quite cryptic, which hints he was one of the first. Unlike the other Guardians, his is a literal staff. There is an old tale about a man named Jothinin who is the only one to stand against a band of men who invade a family's home and attempt to take one of the young women. The tale is about the Guardian Jothinin, and the events took place before his first death. His winged steed is a gray mare called Telling (a fitting name, as he himself chatters incessantly).
Hari: wearer of the purple cloak (color of twilight), Hari was brother to Shai and uncle to Mai. As punishment for speaking disrespectfully of their Qin overlords, Hari was forced into a mercenary company and sent to the Hundreds for an unknown reason, where he was slain and raised as a Guardian. He serves Night and Lord Radas, but searches for some way of severing their hold over him, being extremely unhappy with his current state. He is known to the other Guardians as Lord Twilight and his staff is a spear, which Night and Radas keep from him.
Radas: wearer of the gold cloak (color of the sun), his staff is an arrow. He once was a powerful northern Lord, before dying and becoming a guardian. He leads the army at the direction of Night, and is very arrogant.
Yordenas: wearer of the blood red cloak, his staff is a dagger. Yordenas was a reeve out of Iron Hall, but was killed by bandits when he tried to stop their activities. He came to Argent Hall in Olo'osson many years later as an agent of Night under the premise that his eagle had simply flown off to breed. He then converted much of the hall to the purposes of the army of the Star of Light. He was eventually exposed and fled back to the mysterious Night and Lord Radas.
Bevard: wearer of a cloak the color of forests, his staff is a simple wooden stick that is commonly used to dig out weeds. According to the Woman, he often needs instruction from others and is easily led. He is a cruel and perverted man who enjoys the suffering of others. He was chosen as an easily manipulated replacement for the former wearer of the cloak, who did not agree with Night's plans.
Night: wearer of a cloak the color of night, her staff is a writing box/writing stick. She possesses considerable power over others. She leads the majority of the Guardians as well as the army that sweeps through The Hundred, and has hinted that a former group of Guardians tried to pass sentence on her for a past misdeed. She was one of the first Guardians and was somehow able to either corrupt or destroy the rest. It is hinted that she is the original orphan who pleaded with the gods for Guardians in the first place.
Eyasad: wearer of the brown cloak (color of the earth), she fled from the Guardians, foreseeing that Night would become corrupt and in turn corrupt others. Even after Jothinin and Kirit plead their case to her, she stubbornly refuses to get drawn into the conflict, choosing instead to remain hidden where the Guardians cannot find her.
Joss: wearer of the gold cloak (color of the sun), staff of an arrow. Joss kills Lord Radas and releases his cloak. Later, Joss awakens as the new cloak of gold after his death. Since Joss died as Scar did, his steed is Scar the eagle, instead of a winged horse. Scar is now the only eagle who flies at night.

Books 
 Elliott, Kate (2006). Spirit Gate, Tor Books, New York. 
 Elliott, Kate (2008). Shadow Gate, Tor Books, New York. 
 Elliott, Kate (2010). Traitor's Gate, Tor Books, New York.

References

External links
 Official Kate Elliot web site
 Kate Elliot's Blog - Crossroads Discussion

American fantasy novel series
Tor Books books